WMNI (920 AM) is a commercial radio station licensed to Columbus, Ohio, known as "Fox Sports 920" with a sports format. Locally owned by North American Broadcasting Company, Inc., WMNI serves the Columbus metropolitan area. WMNI's studios are located in Marble Cliff, Ohio, using a Columbus address, while the transmitter resides in Grove City. In addition to a standard analog transmission, WMNI is available online.

Programming
In addition to its sports talk format, WMNI carries a number of local and national sports events, including the Indy 500, the Brickyard 400, Notre Dame college football and Columbus Clippers Triple A baseball.

On Saturday and Sunday mornings, WMNI features talk shows such as "Plant Talk with Fred Hower" and "At Home With Gary Sullivan" as well as some paid brokered programming.  WMNI carries news updates from Fox News Radio.

History
On , WMNI first signed on the air.  For most of its three decades, it had a full service, country radio format.  As country music listening started to move from AM to FM in the 1980s, WMNI switched to a satellite-delivered adult standards format from Westwood One.  By the late 1990s, much of the music was locally programmed using Columbus-based disc jockeys.  As of August 2007, WMNI shifted back to Westwood One's "America's Best Music" format, a mix of soft oldies and standards.

On June 14, 2012 at 6:00 a.m., WMNI switched to a simulcast of WMNI-FM, which had flipped from a classic hits sound as WTDA-FM to a news format.

On July 18, 2013, the AM/FM simulcast ended, with WMNI returning to the soft oldies and adult standards format.

On June 12, 2017, WMNI changed their format from adult standards to soft adult contemporary music, branded as "Easy 95.1 & 920" (simulcast on FM translator W236CZ 95.1 FM Columbus).

On June 14, 2022, WMNI changed their format from soft adult contemporary to sports, branded as "Fox Sports 920", with programming from Fox Sports Radio. The 95.1 translator switched to a relay of sister station WJKR's HD2 subchannel.

Previous logo

References

External links
Official website
Corporate Website

MNI
Radio stations established in 1958
Sports radio stations in the United States
1958 establishments in Ohio